KSHR may refer to:

 The ICAO code for Sheridan County Airport
 KSHR-FM, a radio station (97.3 FM) licensed to Coquille, Oregon, United States